The following is a timeline of the history of the city of Harare, Zimbabwe.

Prior to 20th century

 1890 – Fort Salisbury founded in Mashonaland by British South Africa Company.
 1891 – Mashonaland Herald and Zambesian Times newspaper begins publication.
 1896 – Salisbury Polo Club formed.
 1897
 Harare Township built.
 Salisbury attains municipal status.
 1899 – Beira-Salisbury railway begins operating.

20th century
 1902
 Botswana-Salisbury railway begins operating.
 Queen Victoria Memorial Library founded.
 1915 – Meikles Hotel in business.
 1923 – Town becomes capital of Southern Rhodesia, a self-governing British colony.
 1927 – Salisbury Technical School established.
 1933 – Town House built.
 1936 – Library of the National Archives founded.
 1945 – Railway strike.
 1946
 Reformed Industrial and Commercial Workers Union established.
 Population: 54,090.
 1948
 General strike.
 Zimbabwe College of Music established.
 1950 – Gwebe College of Agriculture established.
 1951
 Stock exchange established.
 Population: 90,024.
 1953
 City becomes capital of the Federation of Rhodesia and Nyasaland.
 Helping Hand Club (women's group) formed.
 1955 – University College of Rhodesia and Nyasaland and Salisbury City Youth League established.
 1956
 Salisbury Airport commissioned.
 Bus boycott.
 1957 – Rhodes National Gallery opens.
 1959 – Pearl Assurance House built.
 1960 – Central Film Laboratories in business.
 1962
 First International Congress of African Culture held in city.
 Queen Victoria Memorial Library rebuilt.
 1964 – Greenwood Park established.
 1969 – The Financial Gazette begins publication.
 1970 – Chapungu Sculpture Park founded.
 1972
 Zimbabwe National Library and Documentation Service headquartered in city.
 Construction of New Mabvuku begins.
 1973 - Population: 502,000 urban agglomeration.
 1975 – Mabvuku High School opens in Mabvuku.
 1977 – 6 August: Bombing.
 1978 – Oil storage tanks set on fire by the Zimbabwe African National Liberation Army.

1980s–1990s
 1980 18 April: City becomes part of independent Republic of Zimbabwe.
 1981
 December: Bombing of ZANU-PF headquarters.
 National Heroes Acre (Zimbabwe) monument built near city.
 1982 18 April: City renamed "Harare."
 1984 – Harare Publishing House established.
 1985 – Karigamombe Centre built.
 1986 – September: City hosts Summit of the Non-Aligned Movement.
 1990
 Sister city relationship established with Cincinnati, US.
 ZANU–PF Building is completed
 1991 – October: City hosts Commonwealth Heads of Government Meeting 1991; Harare Declaration issued.
 1992 - Population: 1,189,103.
 1995 – September: City hosts 1995 All-Africa Games.
 1996
 Rainbow City Cinema in business.
 Eastgate built.
 Women Filmmakers of Zimbabwe headquartered in city.
 1997 – New Reserve Bank tower built.
 1998
 Weaver Press publishing house established
 Economic protest.
 Zimbabwe International Film Festival begins.
 December: City hosts meeting of World Council of Churches.
 1999
 Daily News begins publication.
 Zimbabwe Catholic University established.
 Harare International Festival of the Arts begins.
 Media Monitoring Project headquartered in city.
 2000 – Millennium Towers built.

21st century

2000s

 2001 – Harare Tribune newspaper begins publication.
 2002 – Elias Mudzuri becomes mayor.
 2003
 Water shortage.
 Sekesai Makwavarara becomes acting mayor.
 2004 – Harare International Airport terminal built (approximate date).
 2005 – Operation Murambatsvina.
 2008
 Emmanuel Chiroto elected mayor, succeeded by Muchadeyi Masunda.
 Harare Residents Trust organised.
 Cholera outbreak.
 2009
 First Floor Gallery Harare in business.
 Population: 1,513,173.

2010s

 2010
 NewsDay begins publication.
 Zimbabwe Fashion Week begins.
 Joina City tower built.
 2012 - Population: 1,485,231.
 2013 - Bernard Gabriel Manyenyeni becomes mayor.
 2017 - The military of Zimbabwe seize power and place the president under house arrest.

See also
 Harare history
 List of mayors of Harare
 Timeline of Bulawayo

References

Bibliography

Published in 20th century

Published in 21st century
 
 
 
 
 
 
 
   (Includes information about Harare)

External links

  (Bibliography of open access  articles)
  (Images, etc.)
  (Images, etc.)
  (Bibliography)
  (Bibliography)
  (Bibliography)

Images

History of Harare
Harare
Timeline
Years in Zimbabwe
Harare